The  was a high-speed shinkansen train type operated by East Japan Railway Company (JR East) in Japan. They were the second series of completely bi-level Shinkansen trainsets to be built in Japan (the other being the E1 series). They previously operated on the Tōhoku and Jōetsu Shinkansen, and occasionally on the Nagano Shinkansen. E4 series trains feature double-decker cars to accommodate additional commuter traffic around Tokyo and other urban areas. They were often coupled to 400 series trains on the Tōhoku Shinkansen between Tokyo and Fukushima before the latter retired in April 2010. The last trains of the E4 series were withdrawn from regular service on 1 October 2021.

Two eight-car sets can be coupled together for extra capacity: a sixteen-car E4 series formation trainset carries a total of 1,634 seated passengers, the highest-capacity high-speed rail trainset in the world.

26 units were built between 1997 and 2003.

Formation

Cars 4 and 6 are each equipped with a PS201 pantograph.

Variants
Sets P51 and P52, delivered in January and February 2001 were designed to cope with the steep gradients of the Nagano Shinkansen for use on services to Karuizawa.

Sets P81 and P82, delivered in July and November 2003 were designed to cope with the steep gradients of the Nagano Shinkansen, and are also capable of operating under 50 Hz and 60 Hz overhead power supplies for use on services to Nagano.

Interior
As with the earlier E1 series, the upper deck saloons of non-reserved cars 1 to 3 are arranged 3+3 with no individual armrests, and do not recline. The lower decks of these cars, and the reserved-seating saloons in cars 4 to 8 have regular 2+3 seating. The green car saloons on the upper decks of cars 7 to 8 have 2+2 seating. The trains have a total seating capacity of 817 passengers.

History

The first E4 series set, P1, was delivered to Sendai Depot on 8 October 1997, with the first sets entering revenue-earning service on the Tohoku Shinkansen from 20 December 1997.

All cars were made no-smoking from the start of the revised timetable on 18 March 2007.

In March 2011, it was announced that the entire E4 series fleet would be withdrawn by around 2016.

In September 2012, E4 series were entirely withdrawn from Tohoku Shinkansen services, and all allocated for use on Joetsu Shinkansen services only. The trains were withdrawn from regular service on 1 October 2021, and were completely retired on 17 October of the same year.

Livery change

From 2014, the fleet of 24 sets still in service began to be repainted, receiving a new livery identical to that previously carried by the E1 series trains, with a toki (crested ibis) pink stripe separating the white on the upper body and blue on the lower body. The first reliveried set, P5, was returned to service in early April 2014, with the entire fleet be treated by the end of fiscal 2015.

Withdrawals
Withdrawals started in July 2013, with sets P2 and P3.

Preserved examples

End car E444-1 from set P1 was displayed at the Niigata City Niitsu Railway Museum in Niitsu, Niigata between July and September 2017. It was moved by road from Niigata Depot to the museum in the early hours of 20 June 2017.

Fleet list
The build details are as shown below. All units retired from regular service as of 1 October 2021.

See also
 TGV Duplex, French double-deck high speed train
 List of high-speed trains

References

External links

 E4 Series Max Toki/Max Tanigawa 

Shinkansen train series
East Japan Railway Company
Hitachi multiple units
Kawasaki multiple units
Train-related introductions in 1997
Passenger trains running at least at 200 km/h in commercial operations
Double-decker EMUs
25 kV AC multiple units
Double-decker high-speed trains